Dimethoxybenzaldehyde may refer to:

 2,4-Dimethoxybenzaldehyde (DMBA)
 2,5-Dimethoxybenzaldehyde
 Veratraldehyde (3,4-dimethoxybenzaldehyde)

Benzaldehydes